"H'El on Earth" is a Superman crossover story arc published by DC Comics. Written primarily by Scott Lobdell, it details the appearance of H'El, a mysterious Kryptonian. The plot of "H'El on Earth" follows H'El's plan to restore Krypton and the Superman family's attempts to stop him.

Synopsis 
The story begins after Superman's encounter with alien conqueror Helspont. He engages in a training regime organized by Dr. Shay Veritas, Superman's scientific consultant, so that he can increase his power in case Helspont returns. After a few weeks of exercise in the Block, Dr. Veritas's scientific complex, Superman returns to Metropolis so that he can resume his life as Clark Kent. Realizing that Morgan Edge is manipulating the articles in order to increase his power and influence over Metropolis' media output, Clark quits the Daily Planet. Later, Superman discovers a mysterious alien dragon attacking Metropolis. After a lengthy brawl that leads to Ireland, Superman kills the dragon in an explosion. But in that moment, Kara appears to Superman, telling him that the creature he killed was a Kryptonian animal. She says that if a Kryptonian animal is on Earth, then that means Krypton must still be alive. Unknown to Superman and Supergirl, the Kryptonian H'El watches them from a distance.

Meanwhile, Superboy readjusts to his life at New York City after spending sometime with the Ravagers. As he spends some time with his fellow Teen Titan Bunker, who tries to convince Kon-El to live amongst the other Titans, Superboy is attacked by H'El. As clones were outlawed by Kryptonian authorities, H'El believes Superboy to be an abomination. As Superboy and H'El clash, Bunker calls Wonder Girl, Kid Flash, and Solstice for assistance. H'El clearly outmatches Superboy in power, countering Superboy's telekinesis with his own. Effortlessly defeating the Titans, H'El teleports away with an unconscious Superboy. H'El believes that Superboy's nature as a Kryptonian-human hybrid might be useful in his plan.

Superman and Supergirl take the body of the Kryptonian animal, identified as a Tripodal Curosiananium, to Dr. Veritas. She later returns to her Kryptonian base, the Sanctuary, created by her father to serve as her refuge, much like the Fortress of Solitude. Falling asleep for a while, she awakens at the surface of the Sun, with H'El standing beside her. As they return to Earth, H'El explains that he was sent to Earth by her uncle, Jor-El, before the destruction of Krypton. He offers her the chance to bring Krypton back to life, and as a token of sincerity, he shows her the unconscious body of Superboy, giving Supergirl the chance to decide his fate. Needing some time to think, Supergirl wants to speak with her cousin first, so H'El gives her the ability to understand human language and transports her to Metropolis. However, she walks in on a conversation between Clark and Lois Lane.

Lois visits Clark at his apartment, where they talk about Clark's recent departure from the Daily Planet and Lois' moving in with Jonathan Carroll. In that moment, Clark receives a visit from Supergirl. To avoid an awkward moment, Clark gets Lois out of the apartment. Later, Superman and Supergirl go to the Metropolis Centennial Park. Supergirl reveals she has found another Kryptonian, H'El, who introduces himself to Superman. H'El expresses his plan to save Krypton and shows Superman the unconscious body of his clone, Superboy. H'El tries to kill Superboy, but Superman stops him, and the two engage in a fight. Superboy and Supergirl attempt to intervene, but H'El brutally knocks them out. H'El even uses mental illusions to make Supergirl believe her cousin attacked her. After defeating Superman, H'El leaves Metropolis, but not before stating that he will save Krypton with Kara's help, no matter what price Earth has to pay.

Superman brings the wounded Superboy to the Fortress of Solitude in order to help him recover from his injuries. With the help of Cyborg and Dr. Veritas, Superman devises a way to cure Superboy. Detaching his Kryptonian armor, Superman places it on Superboy. Both realize that the armor is the only thing keeping Superboy alive, as H’El caused serious damage to Superboy’s cellular structure. Suddenly, H’El appears and kicks Superman and Superboy out of the Fortress.

H'El brings Supergirl to the Fortress and asks her to help him in his plan to save Krypton. To do that, first they need to retrieve a crystal from the bottled city of Kandor. Since H'El cannot enter Kandor, he asks Supergirl to do so. He uses his powers to transport Supergirl to Kandor. After she retrieves the crystal, Supergirl returns to the Fortress. Beginning to sympathize with H'El's motivations, she kisses him.

Seeking for a way to stop H'El, Superman and Superboy travel to the prison holding Lex Luthor. Luthor, who is mildly disfigured from a previous attack by Superman, reveals that H'El wants to travel back in time to prevent Krypton's destruction. To do so, he plans to absorb the sun's energy, collapsing the entire solar system. Luthor taunts Superman with the fact that the only way to stop H'El is by killing him, which is something he will never do. As Superman and Superboy leave the prison, Superman calls in the Justice League to help take back the Fortress.

The Justice League attacks the Fortress and Superman informs that they can stop H'El by using a shard of Kryptonite stored in the Fortress. H'El sends security robots against the League while Superboy and Batman arrive to the hangar bay, where the shard is located. However, H'El already stole the shard. H'El activates an alien prison that uses teleportation beams to trap its target into perpetual parallel dimensions. One of the beams hits Superman and Superboy enters one of the beams to rescue him. Superboy locates Superman and the two are able to return home, just a few minutes after they left. Unfortunately, H'El has already completed his machine.

Flash attempts to convince Supergirl that H'El is only manipulating her, but she attacks him. As they fight across the Fortress, Flash gains the upper hand but H'El teleports Flash back into the Justice League Watchtower.

Superman and Superboy reach H'El and Supergirl. Superman attempts to reason with Supergirl, but H'El moves the Fortress away from the Justice League and activates his machine.

Superman, Superboy and Wonder Woman fight H'El as the machine begins draining the sun's energy. H'El takes the armor from Superboy and places it on Superman again, saying that Superman should die with minor dignity. As Superman engages H'El, Wonder Woman goes to help Superboy, who is heavily injured without the armor. As Supergirl attacks him, Superboy attempts to reason with her but she does not listen. Wonder Woman attacks Supergirl while Superboy goes to H'El's machine, intending to destroy it.

Wonder Woman continues fighting Supergirl, restraining her with her lasso and forcing her to see that H'El's plan will destroy Earth. H'El does not care for Earth and forces Supergirl to choose between returning to Krypton and helping the Justice League.

After taking a hit from H'El, Superman is launched to Earth's orbit. There, he meets a cosmic entity known as the Oracle, who gives him a vision of H'El's plan succeeding. As the Oracle disappears, Superman returns to Earth and continues fighting H'El. Superboy manages to destroy H'El's machine, while Supergirl stabs H'El with the Kryptonite shard in order to make up for helping him in the first place. As H'El disappears in the time portal he created, Supergirl falls ill from the Kryptonite poisoning and Superman takes her to the Fortress to heal her injuries. In the epilogue, a few years before Krypton's destruction, a young Jor-El finds an injured H'El in a cave.

Titles 
 Superman Vol. 3 #13–17
 Superboy Vol. 6 #14–17 (Superboy Annual #1)
 Supergirl Vol. 6 #14–17

"Krypton Returns" 

"Krypton Returns" is a story arc that follows the events of H'El on Earth. Written by Lobdell, the story arc begins in Action Comics Annual #2 and continues through the November issues Superboy #25, Supergirl #25, Superman #25.

After the events of H'El on Earth, H'El has been sent to the time period of Krypton's destruction and plans to change history, so Superman and his allies travel to the past in order to stop him. Krypton Returns was also linked into Lobdell's run in Teen Titans and Superman #23.3, which featured H'El in the Forever Evil event.

Backstory
After the events of "H'El on Earth", H'El had been returned to Krypton's past and fallen into a coma. After finding H'El, Jor-El had been running experiments on him so that he could prove Krypton was about to be destroyed. H'El's mind manifests through the astral plane and he sees Jor-El talking with his friend, a young soldier named Zod, about his plans to evacuate Krypton's population to a planet where its sun's radiation could give them special powers. To do that, Jor-El wants to send an unmanned spacecraft named "House of El", equipped with genetic material collected from all of Krypton's history. H'El realizes he was in fact created from the genetic material in the ship and wakes up from his coma, killing Jor-El and Zod. After launching the ship and ensuring his own creation, H'El decides to take over Krypton.

Summary
Superman, Superboy and Supergirl meet up in space and discover Krypton has mysteriously returned to life. The Oracle and his servant Faora explain to them that H'El has taken over Krypton and enslaved the population. He has also been travelling across time in order to save Krypton from destruction, but his travels have caused damage to the timeline. If they do not stop him, the temporal distortions he caused will destroy the universe. They each travel to different points in Krypton's history to systematically stop H'El. Superboy travels to Argo City a week before Krypton's destruction to make sure Supergirl escapes Krypton. Supergirl travels to the age of the Great War to stop the clone rebellion from causing damage to Krypton. Superman travels to Kryptonopolis months before Krypton's explosion to stop H'El at the very moment of his success.

After getting to Argo City, Superboy meets Kara but they are attacked by the Eradicator, who wants to make sure every Kryptonian dies while Krypton explodes. After a small fight, Superboy defeats the Eradicator. As Supergirl arrives at the Great War, she attacked by clones. She defeats them but is left seriously weakened, and then, H'El encounters her, with the Kryptonite shard she impaled him with. Superman is attacked by Lara, his mother, who only stops when she sees the symbol of El in his armor.

Supergirl fights H'El in the Great War while Superboy continues protecting Kara in Argo City. As Superman watches Jor-El and Lara on Kryptonopolis, he encounters a mysterious person who knows about his travel in time. Superboy is attacked by the Eradicator again, but Superboy uses a portal opened by the Oracle to send the Eradicator to Smallville in the present. H'El also attacks Superboy on Argo City, but Superboy and Supergirl realize if H'El is injured in a timeline, he will take damage in another. The clones that attacked Supergirl earlier acknowledge her as their leader and help her in the battle.

Superboy's confrontation with H'El does not last long, as H'El disappears. As Superboy realizes Krypton is about to explode, he tells Kara about his mission. Meanwhile, Supergirl and the clones had defeated H'El, who commits suicide. Supergirl returns to the present while Superboy uses his powers to save Argo City just when Krypton explodes, sacrificing his life. Superman has met his father Jor-El, who comes from an alternate future where he discovered he was the one who created H'El in the first place. He has also travelled to the past to ensure H'El does not conquer Krypton. Superman and Jor-El travel to Krypton's core and fight H'El. At first, Jor-El wants to kill H'El but Superman instead uses H'El own chronal powers against him and freezes him with his super-breath, locking H'El in a state of eternal limbo. As Superman and Supergirl are reunited in the present, the Oracle informs them of Superboy's sacrifice. Superman and Supergirl return to Earth but in a small instant, Krypton is brought back to life in the present, right before it disappears.

Titles 
 Action Comics Annual #2
 Superman #23.3, #25
 Superboy #25
 Supergirl #25

See also

 Bizarro
 Bizarro World

References 

2012 comics debuts